The first of two 1947 Buenos Aires Grand Prix (official name:  I Gran Premio del General Juan Perón, also known as the I Gran Premio Ciudad de Buenos Aires) was a Grand Prix motor race held at the Retiro street circuit in Buenos Aires on February 8–9, 1947. The scheduled competitions opened on February 8 with two preliminary rounds of the  Mecánica Argentina – Fuerza Limitada and Mecánica Argentina – Fuerza Libre classes for a combined final which determined the qualification for the February 9, Formula Libre main event.

Classification

References

Buenos Aires Grand Prix
Buenos Aires Grand Prix (I)
Buenos Aires Grand Prix